Constance Triplett  is an American politician who served as a member of the North Dakota State Senate for the 18th district, from 2003 to 2016. She is a member of the North Dakota Democratic-Nonpartisan League Party.

References

1950s births
Living people
Women state legislators in North Dakota
Democratic Party North Dakota state senators
Year of birth missing (living people)
Place of birth missing (living people)
21st-century American politicians
21st-century American women politicians